Chandra Nagar is a residential locality in the largest city and commercial hub Indore in the state of Madhya Pradesh, India.
Coaching centres and accommodation motels are growing and blooming up here as the growth of population in the locality. It is the Hindu majority area of Indore City.

Postal Code: 452008

Elected Member of the Legislative Assembly: Sanjay Sharma

Outlook
The area consist of many houses which are divided into 3 sectors, A-B-C.
The MR-9 ring road divide Sector A and Sector B of Chandra Nagar and connect it with main A.B. Road.

Societies and flats in Chandra Nagar
The rapid urbanisation of Indore has led to mushrooming of many societies all over the city, noted societies are now coming out.
There are many plots which are under the sell and more are coming out.

Chandra Nagar Rehwasi Sangh
The Chandra Nagar Rehwasi Sangh is a dedicated community which deals with the development of the society and the people. It accounts for the construction work, roads, parks, lodging in the locality.

Chandra Nagar Garden
Developed by the housing society in year 2006, a very beautiful garden is located at the centre of this locality creating a greenery atmosphere in and around the area.

Chandra Nagar Temple
A beautiful temple is the sign board of the locality. It was built in the modern age and almost every community comes to visit the temple.
The annual Garba Mahotsav, Kali Utsav, Ganesha Pujan etc. are held here.

Chandra Nagar Garba Mahotsav
Since the past 30 years, the temple trust organise annual Gujarati dance festival known as Garba Mahotsav during durga puja. Despite of any regional or religional difference, all are invited to enjoy and celebrate the festival which terminates at Ravan Dehen during Vijaya Dashmi.

Food zone
There are many bakery in the area serving fast foods, namkeen, chaat etc.
The restaurants are located nearby in Malhar Mega Mall, C-21 Mall along with Top and Town ice cream corners.

Shopping

Chandra Nagar has a small vegetable markets, a saree shop, a collection of house need and daily needs shops. For branded clothes and luxury items, the residents prefer Pakiza Mall, C-21 Mall, Malhar Mega Mall etc. which are very close to the area.

Banks in Chandra Nagar

There are several banks, just near to the locality with ATMs, in the area. Among them are:
 State Bank of Indore
 ICICI (Malav Parishar)
 City Bank
 State Bank of India

Transportation

Chandra Nagar is on the main A.B. road, which is a primary route connecting Chandra Nagar and Malviya Nagar to Dewas, and Pithampur.

The daily Dewas–Pithampur bus service halts at Malviya Nagar, which is just 5 minutes walk from Chandra Nagar. 
Several City Bus lines also serve the area, with fares ranging from Rs. 5.00 to Rs. 15.00:

Autorickshaws, Metro Taxi, City Van, Magic and Star cab taxis are widely available.

Nearby localities
 Malviya Nagar
 L.I.G. Colony
 Vijay Nagar

Suburbs of Indore
Neighbourhoods in Indore